The Datai Langkawi is a resort in Southeast Asia, situated on the Northwest tip of Langkawi Island off the coast of Malaysia. The resort overlooks the Datai Bay on one side ands a rain forest on the other. The Datai Langkawi opened in October 1993.

Management 
When it opened, The Datai Langkawi was managed by General Hotel Management (GHM), a hotel management company based in Singapore. This resort was the first project of GHM which subsequently came under the management of Destination Resorts & Hotels Sdn. Bhd on 28 July 2011. The Datai Langkawi is currently managed by Datai Hotels and Resorts Sdn Bhd, a company incorporated to manage and operate hospitality properties in Malaysia and beyond.

Refurbishment 
The Datai Langkawi temporarily closed its doors on 4 September 2017 to embark on an extensive USD 60 million renovation project. The Datai Langkawi appointed Didier Lefort to lead this project, the designer who worked with Kerry Hill on the original construction of the property. In September 2018, The Datai Langkawi was reopened initially with a soft launch period.

References 

Buildings and structures in Kedah
Langkawi
Hotels in Malaysia
Architecture in Malaysia
Hotels established in 1993
Hotel buildings completed in 1993